Secret shopper can refer to:

 A store detective hired by stores to pretend they are shopping but really watch for shoplifters
 A mystery shopper sent to a store to evaluate its employees, customer service, and the like